The 36th Legislative Assembly of Ontario, Canada's most-populous province, was in session from June 8, 1995, until May 5, 1999, just prior to the Ontario general election.  Majority was held by the Progressive Conservative Party of Ontario led by Mike Harris.

Allan K. McLean served as speaker for the assembly until September 26, 1996. Edward A. Doyle replaced McLean as speaker until October 3, 1996. Christopher M. Stockwell succeeded Doyle as speaker.

Members of Provincial Parliament

Notable legislation
The Public Sector Salary Disclosure Act, 1996 was passed during the 36th Parliament, bringing with it the first Sunshine lists in Canada.

Notes

References 
Members in Parliament 36

Terms of the Legislative Assembly of Ontario
1995 establishments in Ontario
1999 disestablishments in Ontario